Liam Krall (born May 20, 2002) is an American tennis player.

Krall made his ATP main draw debut at the 2023 Dallas Open after getting a wildcard entry into the singles main draw.

Krall plays college tennis at Southern Methodist University.

References

External links

2002 births
Living people
American male tennis players
SMU Mustangs men's tennis players